"Mess Her Up" is a song recorded by Australian singer-songwriter Amy Shark. The song is about a woman cheating with her best friend's boyfriend and was released digitally on 1 March 2019 as the fifth single from Shark's debut studio album Love Monster.

At the ARIA Music Awards of 2019, the song was nominated for three awards ARIA Award for Best Female Artist, Video of the year and Song of the Year.

At the Queensland Music Awards 2020 "Mess Her Up" won Highest Selling Single.

Music video
The music video was released on 28 February 2019. The video was co-directed by David O'Donohue and Shark with a narrative following a complicated love story. Shark said: "It was important for me to be involved in the process as I was the one who came up with the concept of these two worlds that play out through the video. Mess Her Up is a very deep and emotional song and I needed the actors to do it justice." The video was produced by Felicity Jayn Heath and shot in Los Angeles.

Track listing
 "Mess Her Up" (single edit) – 3:25
 "Mess Her Up" (acoustic) – 3:30

Charts

Weekly charts

Year-end charts

Certifications

Release history

References
 

2019 singles
Amy Shark songs
Sony Music Australia singles
Australian pop rock songs
Songs written by Amy Shark
Song recordings produced by Dann Hume